Cupulospongia is an extinct genus of sea sponges from the Cretaceous of France.

C. elegans is vase shaped with a stout stalk. It is known from the sponge beds at Barrou, France.

The taxonomic position of the genus is unclear. Cupulospongia rimosa Roemer, 1864 is classified in Theonellidae while Cupulospongia tenuis Roemer, 1864 is in Azoricidae, both Demospongiae in the order Tetractinellida.

References 

 Éponges fossiles des sables du terrain crétacé supérieur des environs de Saumur: étage senonien de d'Orbigny. A Courtiller - 1861

External links 
 Cupulospongia at Musée National d'Histoire Naturelle, Paris

Prehistoric sponge genera
Tetractinellida